Harry Kavanagh may refer to:
 Harry Kavanagh (rugby league)
 Harry Kavanagh (footballer)